This is a list of Acacia species (sensu lato) that are used for the production of tannins.

References 

Tannins